was a Japanese samurai of the Azuchi-Momoyama period through early Edo period, who served the Tokugawa clan. He died in 1614.

References
http://www.page.sannet.ne.jp/gutoku2/murakosinaoyosi.html
http://www.geocities.jp/onriedo_gongujodo/murakoshi-naoyoshi.html
http://www.harimaya.com/o_kamon1/hatamoto/hm_mu.html

Samurai
1562 births
1614 deaths